Dehgah (also Romanized as Dehgāh) is a village in Pishkuh-e Zalaqi Rural District, Besharat District, Aligudarz County, Lorestan Province, Iran. At the 2006 census, its population was 40, in 8 families.

References 

Towns and villages in Aligudarz County